Horseplay is a 2003 Australian Comedy drama film, written & directed by Stavros Kazantzidis and co-written & produced by Allanah Zitserman, starring Abbie Cornish and Marcus Graham. The film is set around the famous Melbourne Cup horse race, in Melbourne, Australia. The film was released on 22 May 2003.

Plot 
Lovable rogue Max Mackendrick dreams about winning big on the Melbourne Cup. Set in the colourful world of horseracing, Horseplay follows the chaotic life of a wannabe horse trainer as he deals with the turf, the ladies and everyone else out to get him.

Production 
The filmmakers said they were inspired by Jacobean theatre and Ealing comedies of the 1950s. Shooting began on 5 November 2001 and finished seven weeks later.

Soundtrack
 "Would I Lie to You" – Deborah Conway
 "Every 1's a Winner" – Kate Ceberano
 "The Thrill Is Gone – Renee Geyer
 "Everybody" – Abi Tucker
 "The Payback – James Brown
 "Now That We've Found Love" – Third World
 "I See You Baby" – Groove Armada
 "I Just Wanna Be Loved" – Etherfo
 "You Took All I Had" – Etherfo
 "Watch My Lips" – Nigel Westlake
 "Relax Max" – Nigel Westlake
 "Would You Kill For It" – Nigel Westlake
 "Race Fixing" – Nigel Westlake
 "Till Death Us Do Part" – Nigel Westlake
 "Torpedo" – Nigel Westlake
 "The Train Ride to Hell" – Nigel Westlake
 "Don't Move" – Nigel Westlake
 "Just Drive" – Nigel Westlake
 "Horny Ed" – Nigel Westlake
 "Ecstasy" – Nigel Westlake
 "He's The Guy" – Nigel Westlake
 "Case Dismissed" – Nigel Westlake

References

External links
 
 

2003 films
Australian comedy-drama films
Films scored by Nigel Westlake
2000s English-language films
2000s Australian films